Joey Chan Ho-ling  (born May 20, 1988 in Hong Kong), known as Joey Chan, is a former professional squash player who represents Hong Kong. She reached a career-high world ranking of World No. 16 in May 2012.

Career
Chan joined the Tour in 2003. Her consistent performances at events resulted in her breaking into the world's top 100 in 2006 and she earned semi-final finishes at the NSC Tour 12 No2 and the Taiwan Open the following year. Her first Tour title came at the Indian Challenger No.4 in 2010 and she went on to pick up the China Open and the Chairman's Cup in September of that year. She made it into the top 20 in the world in 2011, when she beat Aisling Blake in the final of the Macau Open to lift the crown and she defeated the number one seed Rachael Grinham to take home the Challenge Cup title a year later.

On 7 October 2013, at the 2013 East Asian Games in Tianjin, China, Joey Chan defeated China's Li Dongjin 3-1 for the women's singles title in squash. Various runner-up finishes followed for Chan over the next few years before she ended her 2014/15 season by lifting the NZ International Classic in June 2015 with a win over Misaki Koboyashi in the main event.

Chan returned to the world's top 20 in August 2016. In December 2016, Chan and fellow Hong Kong teammates captured the bronze medal in World Women's Team Championships by beating the Malaysia Team to get into the semi-finals. In 2017, Chan became the first Hong Kong player reaches the final of the World Games and bagged a Silver medal in the women's single event.

In 2018, she was part of the Hong Kong team that won the bronze medal at the 2018 Women's World Team Squash Championships. Also in 2018, she captured the women's team gold medal in the 18th Asian Games.

Major achievements 

2017
 10th Wroclaw World Games - Women's singles - Silver Medal

2018
 18th Asian Games Women's team - gold medal
 2018 World Women's Team Championships - bronze medal
 2018 Asian Team Championships - Women's team - gold medal
 2018 Hong Kong Squash Championships - Women's singles - silver medal

References

External links 
 
 
 
 

1988 births
Living people
Hong Kong people
Hong Kong female squash players
Asian Games medalists in squash
Asian Games gold medalists for Hong Kong
Asian Games silver medalists for Hong Kong
Asian Games bronze medalists for Hong Kong
Squash players at the 2010 Asian Games
Squash players at the 2014 Asian Games
Squash players at the 2018 Asian Games
Medalists at the 2010 Asian Games
Medalists at the 2014 Asian Games
Medalists at the 2018 Asian Games
Competitors at the 2017 World Games
World Games silver medalists
World Games medalists in squash